National Highway 8B (NH 8B) is an Indian National Highway entirely within the state of Gujarat. It is now part of National Highway 47 (India) in new numbering.

NH 8B, for its entire length, is a part of the North-South and East-West Corridor.

Route
 Rajkot
 Gondal
 Jetpur
 Upleta
Dhoraji
 Ranavav

Gallery

See also
 Bharat Mala

References

External links
 Route map of NH 8B at openstreetmap.org

Transport in Porbandar
National Highways in Gujarat
North–South and East–West Corridor
National highways in India (old numbering)